Al Bidda station is an interchange station between the Doha Metro's Green Line and the Red Line located in Al Bidda Park in the Al Bidda district. The station also serves Mushayrib, Fereej Bin Mahmoud, Rumeilah and Al Jasrah.

The station currently has no metrolinks. Facilities on the premises include an Ooredoo self-service machine, restrooms and a prayer room.

History
The station was opened to the public on 10 May 2019 along with the other Red Line stations.

Connections
It is served by bus routes 31, 34, 40, 41, 42, 45, 55, 56, 100, 101, 102, 102X, 104, 104A, 104B, 156, 156A, 170, 170A and 172.

References

Doha Metro stations
2019 establishments in Qatar
Railway stations opened in 2019